Introduce Me is a 1925 American silent comedy film directed by George J. Crone and produced by and starring Douglas MacLean. It was released through Associated Exhibitors.

Plot
As described in a film magazine review, Jimmy, sightseeing in France, falls in love with Betty at the railroad station. His friend Algy double-crosses him for the love of the young woman. Jimmy has to steal a ticket to get on the train, and all are off for Switzerland. There Jimmy is mistaken for the expert mountain climber Roberts. Betty is introduced to him and believes him to be the champion. The real Roberts appears, and Jimmy discovers that Roberts is the man whose tickets he stole. Roberts is angry and declares that Jimmy must climb the highest mountain there or he will expose him as a thief. Jimmy starts climbing, and a bear chases him to the top. Climbing down, he rolls part of the way and creates a giant snowball. Betty's love for him culminates in a betrothal.

Cast

Preservation
An incomplete print of Introduce Me survives with another print at Gosfilmofond.

References

External links

1925 films
American silent feature films
Films directed by George Crone
American black-and-white films
Silent American comedy films
1926 comedy films
1926 films
1925 comedy films
Associated Exhibitors films
1920s American films